Ernst Wagner (1876-1928) was a German physicist. He was born on 14 August 1876 at Hildburghausen. He first studied medicine and physics at the Universities of Würzburg, Berlin, and Munich, obtaining his doctorate under Wilhelm Röntgen in 1903. He became Privatdozent  in spring 1909 and extraordinary professor in 1915 at the University of Munich. Wagner was notable for his work on X-rays and on the absolute measurement of high pressure.

References
J. Mehra and H. Rechenburg, Historical Development of Quantum Theory, Vol. 1, Springer, p. 322

External links

20th-century German physicists
People from Hildburghausen
Academic staff of the Ludwig Maximilian University of Munich
Academic staff of the University of Würzburg
1876 births
1928 deaths